James Francis Kirby (21 December 1922 – 24 August 1998) was an Australian rules footballer who played with North Melbourne in the Victorian Football League (VFL).

Notes

External links 

1922 births
1998 deaths
Australian rules footballers from Victoria (Australia)
North Melbourne Football Club players